Eslamabad-e Garnechin (also Romanized as Eslāmābād-e Garnechīn; also known as Eslāmābād) is a village in Kuh Sefid Rural District, in the Central District of Khash County, Sistan and Baluchestan Province, Iran. At the 2006 census, its population was 741, in 158 families.

References 

Populated places in Khash County